Allan Horsfall (20 October 1927 – 27 August 2012) was a British gay rights campaigner and founder of the Campaign for Homosexual Equality.

Life 
He was born on 20 October 1927 at Laneshawbridge.

In 1956, following the Suez Crisis, he became radicalised and became a local Councillor in his home town in 1958. He joined the North-East Lancashire Campaign for Nuclear Disarmament. In 1958, he started campaigning for the Homosexual Law Reform Society to implement the findings of the Wolfenden Report published in 1957.

During the 1970s, Horsfall attempted to set up 'Esquire Clubs', co-owned social clubs built on the model of working men's clubs for lesbians and gay men. On 30 July 1971 Allan was part of a CHE public meeting in Burnley Central Library, called "Homosexuals & Civil Liberties". Horsfall spoke of his 1960s campaigning at LGBT History Month events, and he was interviewed for the Millthorpe oral history project.

In popular culture 

Allan Horsfall is the lead character in "The Burnley Buggers' Ball", a play by Stephen M Hornby.  The play was commissioned by LGBT History Month to mark the 50th Anniversary of the Sexual Offences Act 1967 and was performed at the original site of the 1971 CHE meeting "Homosexuals & Civil Liberties" in Burnley Central Library.

References 

1927 births
2012 deaths
Councillors in Lancashire
Gay politicians
English LGBT rights activists
Labour Party (UK) councillors
21st-century LGBT people